Claude Louis d'Espinchal, marquis de Massiac (15 November 1686, Brest – 15 August 1770, Paris) was a French Admiral and Minister.

He was son of Barthélémy d'Espinchal de Massiac, 1626–1700, lawyer. Claude-Louis-René de Mordant, Marquis of Massiac (1746–1806), inherited his fortune including sugar plantations in Santo Domingo.  He held the Club de l'hôtel de Massiac at the Hotel de Massiac, which opposed the Society of the Friends of the Blacks.

French politicians
1686 births
1770 deaths
French Navy officers from Brest, France